The Ministry of Foreign Affairs of Montenegro is the foreign-affairs ministry in the Government of Montenegro.

Ministers of Foreign Affairs, since 1991

External links
Official Website

Government of Montenegro
Montenegro
Foreign Affairs and European Integration
Foreign relations of Montenegro